Douglas Reith is a British actor and teacher. He is best known for his role as Lord Merton in the television series Downton Abbey (2010-2015), as well as its two follow-up films.

Early life
Reith was born in Melton, Suffolk. He studied acting at the Webber Douglas Academy of Dramatic Art. He began acting in the late 1970s, beginning with an appearance in International Velvet (1978) alongside Tatum O'Neal and Christopher Plummer.

Career
He worked as an announcer and presenter at BBC Radio 3 for five years before leaving to study Greats at Christ Church, Oxford for four years beginning in 1989. He worked as an teacher, including at Westminster School, before resuming his acting career.

Reith joined the cast of Downton Abbey as Lord Merton in 2012, and alongside the cast was nominated for the Screen Actors Guild Award for Outstanding Performance by an Ensemble in a Drama Series at the 23rd Screen Actors Guild Awards. He reprised the role in the films Downton Abbey (2019) and Downton Abbey: A New Era (2022). In 2017, Reith was cast in Tim Burton's live-action remake Dumbo (2019). In 2019, he was cast in SAS: Red Notice (2021).

Filmography

Film

Television

References

External links
Douglas Reith at the Internet Movie Database

Living people
20th-century British male actors
21st-century British male actors
Alumni of Christ Church, Oxford
Alumni of the Webber Douglas Academy of Dramatic Art
BBC Radio 3 presenters
British educators
British male film actors
British male television actors
Male actors from London
People from South Kensington
Year of birth missing (living people)